Qulizada is a surname built from Turkic quli and the Persian suffix -zada. It may refer to:

Amit Guluzade (born 1992), Azerbaijani football player 
Khagani Guluzade (born 1977), Azerbaijani businessman
Ramin Guluzade (born 1977), Azerbaijani politician and minister
Vafa Guluzade (1940–2015), Azerbaijani diplomat, political scientist and specialist in conflict resolution
Zumrud Guluzadeh, Azerbaijani professor of philosophy
Mahtab Qolizadeh, Iranian journalist
Ali Qolizadeh, Iranian footballer
Arash Qolizadeh, Iranian footballer
Aref Qolizadeh, Iranian footballer